Lycoming may refer to the following, most of which are at least partly in Lycoming County, Pennsylvania, United States:

Geography
 Lycoming, New York, a hamlet
 Lycoming County, Pennsylvania
 Lycoming Township, Lycoming County, Pennsylvania
 Lycoming Creek, a tributary of the West Branch Susquehanna River

Other uses
 Lycoming Engines, a manufacturer of aircraft engines, and its successor Textron Lycoming
 Lycoming Mall, a shopping mall of Interstate 180
 Lycoming College, a small, private, liberal arts college in Williamsport, Pennsylvania
 , a World War II attack transport

See also
 Old Lycoming Township, Lycoming County, Pennsylvania
 Lycoming Valley Railroad, a shortline railroad along the West Branch Susquehanna River